The Houston House, built in 1900, is an historic Carpenter Gothic style house located at 3708 Mead Avenue in Cincinnati, Ohio. On
August 24, 1979, it was listed in the National Register of Historic Places.

Notes 

National Register of Historic Places in Cincinnati
Carpenter Gothic houses in Ohio
Houses in Cincinnati
Houses on the National Register of Historic Places in Ohio